Robert Alexander MacKay (January 2, 1894 – November 25, 1979) was a Canadian political scientist and diplomat.

After serving in the First World War and studying at the University of Toronto and Princeton University, MacKay taught at Dalhousie University from 1927 to 1947. He was a member of the Rowell–Sirois Commission. During the Second World War, MacKay worked for the Department of External Affairs.

After the Second World War, MacKay rejoined the Department of External Affairs in 1947. He was Canada's Permanent Representative to the United Nations from 1955 to 1958 and Canadian Ambassador to Norway from 1958 to 1961. He then taught at Carleton University from 1961 to 1972.

He was the father of William Andrew MacKay.

References 

 https://www.thecanadianencyclopedia.ca/en/article/robert-alexander-mackay

1894 births
1979 deaths
Canadian political scientists
Canadian diplomats
University of Toronto alumni
Princeton University alumni
Canadian military personnel of World War I
Academic staff of the Dalhousie University
Academic staff of Carleton University
20th-century political scientists